Rivarolo Mantovano is a comune (municipality) in the Province of Mantua in the Italian region Lombardy, located about  southeast of Milan and about  southwest of Mantua. It was known as Rivarolo di Fuori until 1907.

Rivarolo Mantovano borders the following municipalities: Bozzolo, Casteldidone, Piadena, Rivarolo del Re ed Uniti, San Martino dall'Argine, Spineda, Tornata. It is a village with a squared plan and perpendicular roads as established by duke Vespasiano I Gonzaga in the late 16th century.

References

Cities and towns in Lombardy